The City of Albury is a local government area in the Riverina region of New South Wales, Australia. The population of the City of Albury area was 53,767 in June 2018.

The national Hume Highway passes through the area. Other major road transport links include the Riverina Highway that commences east of Albury and runs west to Deniliquin; and north of Albury, the Olympic Highway connects Albury with Cowra. The city forms a major crossing point of the Murray River and also the railway junction of the Main Southern line with the North East line.

Albury was declared a municipality in 1859 and proclaimed a city in 1946.

The Mayor of the City of Albury is Cr. Kylie King, an independent politician.

Suburbs within the local government area 

Suburbs within the City of Albury are:

Demographics
At the 2011 Census, there were  people in the Albury local government area, of these 48.3% were male and 51.7% were female. Aboriginal and Torres Strait Islander people made up 2.3% of the population. The median age of people in the City of Albury area was 37 years. Children aged 0 – 14 years made up 19.4% of the population and people aged 65 years and over made up 15.2% of the population. Of people in the area aged 15 years and over, 46.1% were married and 12.5% were either divorced or separated.

Population growth in the City of Albury Council area between the 2001 Census and the 2006 Census was 9.38%; and in the subsequent five years to the 2011 Census was 3.30%. When compared with total population growth of Australia for the same periods, being 5.78% and 8.32% respectively, population growth in the Albury local government area was generally on par with the national average. The median weekly income for residents within the City of Albury area was slightly below the national average.

At the 2011 Census, the proportion of residents in the Albury local government area who stated their ancestry as Australian or Anglo-Saxon exceeded 77% of all residents (national average was 65.2%). In excess of 58% of all residents in the City of Albury area nominated a religious affiliation with Christianity at the 2011 Census, which was slightly higher than the national average of 50.2%. Meanwhile, as at the Census date, compared to the national average, households in the Albury local government area had a significantly lower than average proportion (6.8%) where two or more languages are spoken (national average was 20.4%); and a significantly higher proportion (90.4%) where English only was spoken at home (national average was 76.8%).

Council

Current composition and election method
Albury City Council is composed of nine Councillors elected proportionally as a single ward. All Councillors are elected for a fixed four-year term of office. The Mayor is elected by the Councillors at the first meeting of the Council. The most recent election was held on 4 December 2021, and the makeup of the council is as follows:

The current Council, elected in 2021, in order of election, is:

Sister city 

The City of Albury has a sister city with:
Wodonga

See also
 List of mayors of Albury
 List of local government areas in New South Wales

References

External links
Albury City Council – official website
Local Government & Municipal Knowledge Base – Albury City Council Page

 
Albury
Albury
Albury, New South Wales